The Rawashdeh clan is a clan concentrated in modern-day Jordan, with a minority presence in southern Syria and the West Bank. The Rawashdehs are sometimes referred to as Al-Rashid or Bani Rashid; literally meaning the sons of Rashid, the founder of the clan. Rawashdeh is the plural of Rashid in colloquial Jordanian.

The main concentration of the Rawashdeh clan is in the area of Ai in the southern governorate of Kerak and the village of El-Kitteh in the northern governate of Jerash. Also, in Qumaim a village located in Irbid City. The clan is originally believed to originate from Kerak and to have later immigrated to Kitteh and other villages in the governate of Irbid, the city of Ramtha, Hebron in the West Bank and the governate of Dir'aa in southern modern-day Syria.

The Rawashdehs are said to originate from the Al-Daighami from the tribe of Qahtan from Arabia. It is said that ancient Rawashdeh poets would start their poems with the verses:

حنا عيال الضيغــــمي هل الشومــــات ................ وأهـل الكـــرم والجود وأهل الحميَه

حنا بني راشــــد للمــــجد ســــــــادات.................. حنا صقور نحوم فــــوق البريـــــــه

We the Daighamis are people of pride.....and people of generosity and warmth

We are the sons of Rashid, masters of glory......we are hawks who swarm over the terrain
  
The Rawashdeh clan is a notable clan in Jordan, holding many key positions in military, political, public and private sectors in Jordan. Many of the clans members have immigrated to the Gulf, Europe and US.

Karak Governorate
Ethnic groups in Jordan